Golden is a town in southeastern British Columbia, Canada,  west of Calgary, Alberta, and  east of Vancouver.

History
In 1807, David Thompsonrenowned fur trader, surveyor, and map makerwas tasked by the North West Company to open a trading route to the lucrative trading territories of the Pacific Northwest. He first crossed over the Rocky Mountains and travelled along the Blaeberry River to the future site of Golden.

In 1881 the Canadian Pacific Railway (CPR) hired surveyor A. B. Rogers to find a rail route through the Selkirk and Rocky Mountains, and in 1882 he found the pass now named for him. Rogers established a base camp for his survey crew led by a man named McMillan. Initially known as McMillan's Camp, the settlement was the beginning of the town of Golden. By 1884, in response to a nearby lumber camp naming itself Silver City, the residents of McMillan's Camp, headed by Baptiste Morigeau, decided not to be outdone and renamed the settlement Golden City. The word city was later dropped.

Golden is also the site of notable South Asian Canadian history, after Sikh settlers first arrived in Golden in 1902 to work at the Columbia River Lumber Company. These early settlers built the first  (Sikh temple) in North America in 1905, which burned down in 1926.

Much of the town's history is tied into the CPR and the logging industry. The town's economy still relies heavily on those two influences, but the development of Kicking Horse Mountain Resort, along with other outdoor adventure companies, has allowed the town to diversify into tourism. Mount 7, which is just southeast of town, is popular with paragliding, hang gliding, and mountain biking enthusiasts. The town forms part of the Golden Triangle cycle route.

Kicking Horse Pedestrian Bridge is the longest freestanding timber-framed bridge in Canada. Planned as a community project by the Timber Framers Guild, volunteers from Golden were joined by carpenters and timber framers from the United States and from Europe. The bridge was completed in September 2001.

In June 2021, the Golden Skybridge opened. The bridge is the highest suspension bridge in Canada.

The Golden meteorites fell there on October 4, 2021.

Geography
Golden is nestled in the Rocky Mountain Trench, built around the confluence of the Columbia and Kicking Horse rivers, surrounded by three different mountain ranges (most notably the Purcell Mountains and Rocky Mountains) and five national parks: Yoho National Park, Banff National Park, Jasper National Park, Glacier National Park, and Kootenay National Park.

Golden is on Highway 1 (the Trans-Canada Highway), and it is the northern terminus of Highway 95, connecting it to the United States via the rest of the East Kootenay region and the city of Cranbrook, British Columbia (B.C. Highway 95 is a continuation of U.S. Route 95, which runs north-to-south through the U.S. and into Mexico). The Trans-Canada Highway east of Golden has numerous upgrade projects ongoing to greatly improve the roadway west of the Yoho National Park boundary. The Ten Mile Hill section of the project was recently completed and is a major upgrade to the old highway.

Climate
Golden has a climate with influences of the humid continental (Dfb) and semi-arid (BSk) varieties. Summers are warm but rarely hot, with winters being somewhat moderated in comparison to areas east of the Rockies. Annual snowfall is heavy, averaging .

Demographics 

Religion 
According to the 2021 census, religious groups in Golden included:
Irreligion (2,430 persons or 62.3%)
Christianity (1,225 persons or 31.4%)
Sikhism (115 persons or 2.9%)
Hinduism (40 persons or 1.0%)
Buddhism (15 persons or 0.4%)
Other (55 persons or 1.4%)

Economy 
Golden has a service-based economy, relying heavily on tourism and services for tourists. Unlike many other Canadian towns with similar population size, Golden boasts nine automobile repair shops that all offer a wide range of services and are open extended hours. Golden also features a large number of hotels with mountain views that provide accommodation to both tourists and stranded drivers.

Education
Public education is provided by School District 6 Rocky Mountain which operates 3 primary schools and one secondary school.  Community College education is offered by the Golden Campus of the College of the Rockies.

Sports

Notable people
Doug Barrault, retired hockey player
Dillon Dubé, NHL player with the Calgary Flames
David Duncan, freestyle skier
Curtis McKenzie, NHL player with the Dallas Stars
Patricia Owens, actress
Sara Renner, Olympic medal-winning cross country skier

References

External links

Towns in British Columbia
Columbia Valley
Populated places in the Columbia-Shuswap Regional District
British Columbia populated places on the Columbia River